Bradlee, Winslow & Wetherell (1872-1888) was an architecture firm in Boston, Massachusetts.  Its principals were Nathaniel Jeremiah Bradlee (1829-1888), Walter Thacher Winslow (1843-1909) and George Homans Wetherell (1854-1930).  Most of the firm's work was local to Boston and New England, with a few commissions as far afield as Seattle and Kansas City.  

The firm is variously credited.  Nathaniel Bradlee had run a thriving solo practice in Boston since 1854.  In 1872 Bradlee promoted Winslow to partner, creating Bradlee & Winslow for 12 years.  (Bradlee appears to retain solo credit for some projects afterward, for example Danvers State Hospital.)  In 1884 Wetherell was also promoted, creating Bradlee, Winslow & Wetherell.

Bradlee died in 1888.  Winslow & Wetherell then formed their partnership as Bradlee's successor firm.  Architect Henry Forbes Bigelow (1867-1929) joined the organization around 1898, after which the partnership was credited as Winslow, Wetherell & Bigelow, then Winslow & Bigelow, and in its last incarnation Winslow, Bigelow & Wadsworth.  Winslow died in 1909 and control of the partnership went to Bigelow.  

A number of works by the firm are listed on the National Register of Historic Places.

Work 

Works include (with attribution):

 Wigglesworth Building, 89-83 Franklin St., Boston, 1873 (Bradlee & Winslow)
 St. Andrew's By-The-Sea, Church Rd., 0.2 mi. SE of jct. with South Rd. and Rte. 1A Rye, NH, 1876 (credited to Winslow and Wetherell), NRHP-listed 
 Bijou Theatre, Boston, 1882 (Bradlee & Winslow)
 Chickering Hall, Tremont St., Boston, 1883 (Bradlee & Winslow)
 Old New England Building, Kansas City, Missouri, 1886 (Bradlee, Winslow & Wetherell), NRHP-listed
 Union Station, Portland, Maine, 1888 (Bradlee, Winslow & Wetherell)
 Maine Central Railroad General Office Building, 222-224 Saint John Street, Portland, Maine, 1889 (Bradlee, Winslow & Wetherell), NRHP-listed, built out in stages through 1916
 The Oaks, 437 E. Beverly St. Staunton, Virginia, 1890 (Winslow & Wetherell), NRHP-listed
 Building at 30–34 Station Street, Brookline, Massachusetts, 1892 (Winslow & Wetherell), NRHP-listed
 Boston Block, Pioneer Square, Seattle, Washington, 1896 (razed 1921)
 Banigan Building, Providence, Rhode Island, Providence's first skyscraper, 1896 (Winslow & Wetherell)
 Steinert Hall, Boston, 1896 (Winslow & Bigelow)
 Boston Hotel Buckminster, Boston, 1897 (Winslow & Bigelow) 
 Hotel Touraine, Boston, 1897 (Winslow & Bigelow) 
 St. Mark's School, Southborough, Massachusetts, 1902 (Winslow & Bigelow)
 Needham Town Hall Historic District, Needham, Massachusetts, 1902 (Winslow & Bigelow)
 Compton Building, Boston, 1903 (Winslow & Bigelow)
 Boston Edison Electric Illuminating Company building, Boston, 1906 (Winslow & Bigelow)
 Antiquitarian Hall, for the American Antiquarian Society, Worcester, Massachusetts, 1910 (Winslow, Bigelow & Wadsworth)
 Children's Hospital Boston, Huntington Ave. (Bradlee, Winslow & Wetherell)
 Baker Chocolate mill complex, (Bradlee, Winslow & Wetherell) Dorchester-Milton Lower Mills Industrial District, Massachusetts
 One or more works in Dorchester-Milton Lower Mills Industrial District, both sides of Neponset River Boston, MA (Bradlee, Winslow,& Wetherell), NRHP-listed
 One or more works in boundary increase to Dorchester-Milton Lower Mills Industrial District, roughly: Adams, River, Medway Sts., Millers Lane, Eliot and Adams Sts. Boston, MA (Bradlee, Winslow & Wetherell; Winslow & Wetherell; et al.), NRHP-listed

Gallery

References

Defunct architecture firms based in Massachusetts
Companies based in Boston
Architects from Boston
Design companies established in 1872
1872 establishments in Massachusetts
1888 disestablishments in Massachusetts
19th century in Boston
Historicist architects